Niels Siggaard Andersen (also known as Niels Siggaard) is a Danish and later Norwegian curler.

Teams

Men's

Mixed

References

External links
 

Living people
Danish male curlers
Danish curling champions
Norwegian male curlers
Danish emigrants to Norway
Norwegian emigrants to Denmark
Year of birth missing (living people)